Dias Felices (Happy Days) is the tenth studio album by Cristian Castro. It was released in 2005. Both the album and the song, Amor Eterno, were nominated for Pop Album of the Year and Pop Song of the Year in the Premios Lo Nuestro Awards of 2007.

Track listing
Sin Tu Amor
Si Ya No Estas Aquí
Viajando en el Tiempo
Simone
Dinamita
Amor Total
Descontrol
Amor Eterno
Abarazado a Tu Piel
Dias Felices

Chart positions

Charts

Sales and certifications

References

2005 albums
Cristian Castro albums
Universal Music Latino albums
Albums produced by Cachorro López